John Albert may refer to:

John I Albert (1459–1501), King of Poland 
Duke John Albert of Mecklenburg (1857–1920)
John Albert (canoeist) (born 1949), British slalom canoer
John Albert (fighter) (born 1986), American mixed martial artist
John Albert (ice hockey) (born 1989), American ice hockey player
John David Albert (1810–1899), mountain man, born in Hagerstown, Maryland
John F. Albert (1915–1989), Deputy Chief of Chaplains of the U.S. Air Force

See also